The Papua grassland mosaic-tailed rat (Melomys lutillus), also known as the grassland melomys, is a species of rodent in the family Muridae.
It inhabits grassland, gardens and other disturbed areas.

The International Union for Conservation of Nature has assessed its conservation status as being of "least concern". This is because it has a wide range, can tolerate disturbance to its habitat and no particular threats have been identified.

References

Melomys
Mammals of Papua New Guinea
Taxa named by Oldfield Thomas
Mammals described in 1913